Kappa Alpha Pi may refer to:

 Kappa Alpha Pi National Fraternity, a secondary school fraternity founded in 1904 at Englewood High School in Chicago, Illinois
 Kappa Alpha Pi (professional), a pre-law professional fraternity founded in 2007 at the University of Michigan